Yvan Serge Cournoyer (born November 22, 1943) is a Canadian former  professional hockey right winger who played in the National Hockey League for the Montreal Canadiens for 16 seasons, from  to , winning 10 Stanley Cups. In 1972, Cournoyer scored the tying goal in the deciding game eight of the Canada-USSR series with seven minutes remaining. Canada would go on to win the game and series on Henderson's dramatic goal with 34 seconds left in the game. 

Cournoyer was born in Drummondville, Quebec. He was nicknamed "The Roadrunner" due to his small size and blazing speed, which he credited to longer blades on his skates. He was inducted into the Hockey Hall of Fame in 1982. In 2017 Cournoyer was named one of the '100 Greatest NHL Players' in history.

Playing career 

In 1961, Cournoyer started his junior ice hockey with the Montreal Junior Canadiens of the Ontario Hockey Association. By the time he was 18 years old, his legs had become so muscular that he required specially tailored pants.

Cournoyer made his NHL debut in 1963 with the Montreal Canadiens and earned a full-time spot with the club in 1964 after just seven games with the American Hockey League's Quebec Aces.

Cournoyer was initially regarded by Canadiens head coach Toe Blake as a defensive liability and undeserving of a regular shift, though he was still frequently used on the power play. That changed after Blake's departure following the Canadiens'  Stanley Cup Championship, when incoming coach Claude Ruel granted Cournoyer a full-time shift.

In the  Stanley Cup playoffs, he had his best playoffs ever, scoring 15 goals and tallying 10 assists in 17 games, earning the Conn Smythe Trophy following the Canadiens' defeat of the Chicago Black Hawks in the Stanley Cup Finals.

Cournoyer was named captain of the Canadiens in 1975 following the retirement of Henri Richard, pushing him to play harder in his new leadership role. Cournoyer would become only one of the Habs' two captains to win Stanley Cups throughout his entire (2+ year) tenure as captain, the other one being Maurice Richard, Henri's older brother. The speedy Cournoyer's ability to stay true to his form in his older age was a favourite topic of discussion of the Montreal fans and hockey media, however, and he did slow down due to a disc in his back that was pressing on a nerve and causing him great pain. Cournoyer eventually had to have surgery on his back and missed the entire 1977 playoffs.

He managed to perform in the playoffs again, however, with seven goals and four assists in 15 games en route to Montreal's third consecutive Cup. However, he was forced to retire following the 1979 season after playing in just fifteen games. When he retired, he only trailed Maurice Richard, and Jean Beliveau on the Canadiens' all-time scoring list. Cournoyer won a total of 10 Stanley Cups as a player (tied with Beliveau), second only to Henri Richard's 11. The Cournoyer legacy includes many Top 10 Canadien records - 7th in total games played (968), 4th in goals scored (428), 7th in assists (435) and 6th in total points scored (863).

Cournoyer played for Canada in the 1972 Summit Series, and is part of the famous picture wherein Paul Henderson jumps into his arms after scoring the game (and series) winner. Cournoyer scored three goals during the series. Late in the third period of Game 8, his goal tied the score, making a win by Canada possible.

He serves as an official ambassador for the Montreal Canadiens.

Career statistics

Regular season and playoffs

International

See also
 List of players with 5 or more goals in an NHL game
 List of NHL players who spent their entire career with one franchise

References

External links

1943 births
Living people
Canadian ice hockey right wingers
Conn Smythe Trophy winners
Hockey Hall of Fame inductees
Ice hockey people from Quebec
Montreal Canadiens players
Montreal Junior Canadiens players
Montreal Roadrunners
National Hockey League players with retired numbers
Quebec Aces (AHL) players
Sportspeople from Drummondville
Stanley Cup champions